Pidjani is a town located on the island of Grande Comore in the Comoros.

Populated places in Grande Comore